Polycera kaiserae is a species of sea slug, a nudibranch, a shell-less marine gastropod mollusc in the family Polyceridae.

Distribution 
This species was described from Bahía de Banderas, Mexico.

Description
Polycera kaiserae has a pink body covered with white spots. The oral veil processes, pedal corners, branchial plumes, rhinophores, extrabranchial appendages and tail all have navy blue coloration followed by white at the tips.

References

Polyceridae
Gastropods described in 2007